Cervere is a comune (municipality) in the Province of Cuneo in the Italian region Piedmont, located about  south of Turin and about  northeast of Cuneo.

Cervere borders the following municipalities: Cherasco, Fossano, Marene, Salmour, and Savigliano.

It is internationally known for the production of a renowned kind of leek called porro

References

Cities and towns in Piedmont